Bonamia pilbarensis is a herb in the family Convolvulaceae.

The herb is found in the Pilbara region of Western Australia.

References

pilbarensis
Plants described in 2014